Bridie O'Donnell (born 29 April 1974) is an Australian civil servant, medical practitioner and former professional road cyclist. She represented her nation at the 2008, 2009 and 2010 UCI Road World Championships.

O'Donnell was a medical practitioner and surgical assistant before taking up cycling, and later returned to medicine to work in health assessment.

On 22 January 2016 O'Donnell broke the Women's Hour record at the Adelaide Super-Drome. She rode 46.882 kilometres, exceeding the distance set by Molly Shaffer Van Houweling the previous September by 609 metres.

Work life
O'Donnell is a medical doctor, graduating from the University of Queensland's school of medicine in 1998 and is the current head of the Office for Women in Sport and Recreation for the Victorian State Government. She was employed by Australian TV network Special Broadcasting Service (SBS) as a commentator for the 2020 Tour de France, the first woman to do so for SBS. She co-commentated on the Tour de France in 2021 and again in 2022.

In May 2021 she was appointed to the board of the Collingwood Football Club. She replaced Alex Waislitz who joined the Collingwood board in 1998. Her appointment generated controversy, because O'Donnell had been a Collingwood member for less than two years, contravening Collingwood's constitution, which states "No member shall be qualified for election as a member of the board unless he (or she) shall have been a member of the club for at least 24 months immediately prior to nomination."

O'Donnell is also Executive Director of the Victorian Government's Public Events Team and Director of the Gender Equity Project. She was the inaugural Director of the Office for Women in Sport and Recreation between 2017-2020 and a physician with Epworth HealthCheck between 2013 and 2017.

In November 2021 she was inducted onto the Victorian Honour Roll of Women.

Major results

2007
 1st  Time trial, Oceania Road Championships
 2nd Chrono des Nations
 7th Chrono Champenois – Trophée Européen
2008
 1st  Time trial, National Road Championships
 4th Chrono des Nations
 10th Memorial Davide Fardelli
2009
 1st  Time trial, Oceania Road Championships (January)
 Oceania Road Championships (November)
1st  Road race
3rd Time trial
 2nd Overall Tour de PEI
 5th Chrono Champenois
 7th Memorial Davide Fardelli
2010
 National Road Championships
2nd Road race
2nd Time trial
 8th Memorial Davide Fardelli
2011
 Oceania Road Championships
2nd  Road race
2nd  Time trial
 4th Time trial, National Road Championships
2012
 3rd  Time trial, Oceania Road Championships
 3rd Time trial, National Road Championships
2013
 7th Chrono des Nations
2014
 3rd Time trial, National Road Championships
 Oceania Road Championships
5th Time trial
10th Road race
2015
 2nd Time trial, National Road Championships
2016
 World Hour record 46.882 km (22 January 2016)
 2nd  Time trial, Oceania Road Championships

Works
 Life and death : a cycling memoir, Melbourne : Slattery Media Group, 2018. ,

References

External links
 

1974 births
Australian female cyclists
Living people
Place of birth missing (living people)
Australian sports executives and administrators
University of Queensland academic journals
Collingwood Football Club administrators